Patrick Rupert Hennessey (born August 1982) is a British barrister, author, journalist and former British Army officer.

Education
Hennessey was educated at Berkhamsted School and Balliol College, Oxford. He attended the Royal Military Academy Sandhurst in 2004, and was the winner of the Queen’s Medal on his commissioning course.

Military career
From Sandhurst he was commissioned into the Grenadier Guards in January 2005. He was deployed to the Balkans, Africa, South East Asia, and the Falkland Islands, and saw active service in the Iraq War and Afghanistan. He retired from the army in 2009 with the rank of captain.

Legal career
After training at BPP Law School, Hennessey qualified as a barrister in 2010. Since then he has been practising with 39 Essex Chambers, based in London.

Media
Hennessey reported as a special foreign correspondent for The Times and has written numerous newspaper, magazine and journal articles in the UK and the USA. Hennessey wrote and presented a documentary entitled Kipling’s Indian Adventure which was shown on BBC Two in February 2016.

The programme looked into Rudyard Kipling's early life and career in India. He has written two books, both of which are accounts of his time as a British Army officer. He is a member of the Royal United Services Institute and is a regular media commentator on defence and legal matters.

Publications
The Junior Officers’ Reading Club: Killing Time and Fighting Wars (2009)
Kandak (2012)

References

1982 births
Living people
Alumni of Balliol College, Oxford
British Army personnel of the Iraq War
British Army personnel of the War in Afghanistan (2001–2021)
British barristers
British journalists
British non-fiction writers
Graduates of the Royal Military Academy Sandhurst
Grenadier Guards officers
People educated at Berkhamsted School
21st-century King's Counsel
Date of birth missing (living people)